The Stereo Bus are a New Zealand band, formed by David Yetton, formerly of the Jean-Paul Sartre Experience.

The band recorded two albums: The Stereo Bus in 1997 and Brand New in 1999 and were originally active between 1997 and 2000.

In March 2011 founder David Yetton announced a new line-up and indicated he would return to playing live and recording under The Stereo Bus moniker

Discography

Studio albums

 The Stereo Bus (1997 – Beats Bodega Records – BEATS005 / EMI (NZ) Ltd. – 5226082)
Shallow
Don't Open Your Eyes
Wash Away
Mirror
Be A Girl
Tell
Lie in the Arms
Waste of Time
Bright Lights
Fade
God's Fingers
Far Away

 Brand New (1999 – EMI – 5226092)
Hey Thank You
Touchdown
Pretty Boys And Girls
Birthday
Brand New
Quiet Rose
Caramel
Nova Scotia
Let It Flow
Hold You Close
Burning Alcohol

Compilations
 Double Decker (2001) (Box set of first two albums)

EPs
 Be a Girl
 HeyThank You
 Birthday

References

New Zealand musical groups
Musical groups established in 1997
Musical groups disestablished in 2000
Musical groups reestablished in 2011